Heliozoa, commonly known as sun-animalcules, are microbial eukaryotes (protists) with stiff arms (axopodia) radiating from their spherical bodies, which are responsible for their common name. The axopodia are microtubule-supported projections from the amoeboid cell body, and are variously used for capturing food, sensation, movement, and attachment. They are similar to Radiolaria, but they are distinguished from them by lacking central capsules and other complex skeletal elements, although some produce simple scales and spines. They may be found in both freshwater and marine environments.

Classification
Originally the heliozoa were treated together as a formal taxon Heliozoa or Heliozoea, with the rank of class or phylum, but it has been realised that they are polyphyletic, as the various orders show notable differences and are no longer believed to be descended from a single common ancestor. Instead, "heliozoa" is regarded as a descriptive term applying to various lines of protists.

The primary groups include:

 Actinophryida, Pedinellida and Ciliophryida (currently in Stramenopiles)
 Centrohelida (some support for Hacrobia)
 Desmothoracida, Heliomonadida/Dimorphida and Gymnosphaerida (currently in Rhizaria > Cercozoa)
 Taxopodida/Sticholonche (currently in Rhizaria > Radiolaria)
 Rotosphaerida (currently in Opisthokonta > Nucleariida and in Rhizaria)

Several nucleariids were once considered heliozoa, but they do not have microtubule-supported axopods and so are now considered filose amoeboids instead.

References

External links

 Actinosphaerium (single-celled) is an example of a heliozoa. For an image see http://www.microscopy-uk.org.uk/index.html?http://www.microscopy-uk.org.uk/ponddip/
 

Obsolete eukaryote taxa
Eukaryote orders